Menaggio is a town and comune in the province of Como, Lombardy, northern Italy, located on the western shore of Lake Como at the mouth of the river Senagra.

Menaggio has three frazioni (parishes): Croce, Loveno and Nobiallo.

History
The area of current Menaggio was conquered by the Romans in 196 BC. The Roman conquest culminated with the construction of a road called the Via Regina.

Menaggio was a walled city. Remnants of the wall are evident today.

Construction of big hotels in this cool summer area made it a summer resort area.

Between 1873 and 1939, Menaggio was linked to Porlezza, on Lake Lugano, by the Menaggio–Porlezza railway, a steam hauled narrow gauge line built as part of a multi-modal transport link between Menaggio and Luino, on Lake Maggiore.

Tourism 
The area of Menaggio is a favorite recreational resort in the summer. Lake Como's only youth hostel is in Menaggio.

Menaggio is known for its Menaggio and Cadenabbia Golf Club, founded in 1907 by an English gentleman, one of many who was spending his holidays on Lake Como during the late 19th century.

Geology 
The craggy and often fog hidden mountains are from the Cretaceous period, composed of limestone sediment weathered by millennia.

Events
Among many events which occur in the town every summer, the Menaggio Guitar Festival is relevant on an international scale. Guitarists who have played there since its first edition on 2005 include Pete Huttlinger, Martin Taylor, Franco Cerri, Roman Bunka, Solorazaf and Ferenc Snetberger.

The artistic director is Sergio Fabian Lavia, composer and musician born in Argentina.

Twin towns
 Allevard, France
 Carapicuíba, Brazil
 Wolpertswende, Germany

References

External links

 Official website

Menaggio